Michael Andrew Kyle (born March 31, 1980) is an American professional mixed martial artist and boxer currently competing in the Heavyweight division. A professional competitor since 2001, Kyle has competed for the UFC, the WEC, Strikeforce, the World Series of Fighting, Absolute Championship Berkut, Pancrase, and King of the Cage. He is the former WEC Heavyweight Champion and King of the Cage Light Heavyweight Champion.

Background
Kyle is from Boise, Idaho. He attended Nampa High School and was friends with the late Justin Eilers, who Kyle would actually end up fighting in his second fight for the UFC. Eilers and a friend who were both two grades ahead of Kyle, taught him Brazilian jiu-jitsu techniques when he was a sophomore in high school. Kyle was also a talented football player, playing fullback for Butte College in Oroville, California and Eastern Oregon University. During his early mixed martial arts career he split time between fighting and playing football. He was invited to a spring camp for the San Francisco 49ers, but ultimately decided to focus on mixed martial arts.

Mixed martial arts career

Early career
Kyle held an undefeated amateur record of 3–0 before turning professional. Kyle made his professional debut on March 10, 2001, when he was 18 years old and won by TKO only 90 seconds into the fight. He then won his next two fights, also by punches before debuting in the King of the Cage promotion. Kyle made his King of the Cage debut in a fight for the King of the Cage Super Heavyweight Championship against then King of the Cage Super Heavyweight Champion Dan Bobish. Kyle, who then weighed 275 lbs. was outweighed by Bobish, who was 55 lbs. bigger than Kyle. Despite rocking Bobish early in the fight and almost pulling off the upset, Kyle was handed his first career loss after he submitted due to punches. In his next KOTC bout, Kyle made his Heavyweight debut against future King of the Cage Heavyweight Champion Paul Buentello. Kyle lost after he was knocked out from punches. After losing to Buentello, the San Jose-based American Kickboxing Academy invited Kyle to train. He accepted and has been training with AKA ever since.

In his next fight, Kyle made his debut in the WEC, and snapped his two-fight losing streak with a knockout win. The 4–2 Kyle then fought in the IFC and again won by strikes as his opponent tapped out due to punches. Kyle then also won his next two fights, which included another win under the WEC banner.

Ultimate Fighting Championship
Kyle made his UFC debut against Wes Sims winning via KO at 4:59 of round one. Sims took the fight a days notice after Kyle's original opponent filled into the main event after Tim Sylvia failed a drug test. Kyle dominated the entire first round and knocked Sims out at 4:59. Sims protested after the fight that Kyle had bitten him on the chest. During the post-fight interview, a bite mark could clearly be seen on Sims' left pectoral muscle. This marks the first time a bite has ever happened in a UFC fight since its inception at UFC 1 in 1993, when Gerard Gordeau bit Royce Gracie in the championship match. Kyle still denies any wrongdoing.

Kyle then fought the late Justin Eilers in a Heavyweight bout. This was a significant match up as Eilers was a friend of Kyle's who had actually introduced Kyle to the sport of mixed martial arts. Kyle lost the fight when he was knocked out from a punch 74 seconds into the first round.

He then fought former WEC Heavyweight Champion James Irvin at UFC 51 winning via knockout in the first round. Despite this relatively notable win in the UFC, Kyle requested his release in from the UFC to compete in Japan.

Post-UFC
Kyle then left the UFC and had planned to fight in the PRIDE Fighting Championships in Japan. However, the plan fell through and in his next bout he fought in Japan's Pancrase where he defeated Japanese legend Tsuyoshi Kohsaka. Kyle won the fight via (technical) decision in round three after ringside doctors ruled Kohsaka unable to continue. Kyle had cut down from 245 lbs. to 230 lbs. for the fight. He then fought against Devin Cole at WEC 18: Unfinished Business, and lost by TKO. This was Kyle's first defeat in the WEC.

Strikeforce
He then signed with Strikeforce, making his debut against Krzysztof Soszynski in a Heavyweight bout at Strikeforce: Shamrock vs. Gracie. The fight was declared a technical draw after Soszynski was accidentally poked in the eye by Kyle. Kyle then fought Brian Olsen for the WEC Heavyweight Championship and was disqualified after he hit Olsen with illegal strikes, for which he was placed on the national suspension list, and given an 18-month ban. After throwing Olsen over his shoulder, Kyle hit Olsen, who was on his knees and therefore a grounded opponent, with a soccer kick and then repeatedly hit him with strikes, continuing to hit Olsen even after fight referee Josh Rosenthal had physically tried to separate them, and did not stop until referee Herb Dean ran into the cage to assist Rosenthal.

The 10–5–1 Kyle then fought at Strikeforce: Shamrock vs. Le against former All-American wrestler Wayne Cole in a Heavyweight bout and lost after he was submitted from an armbar. Kyle then returned to the IFC and won his bout via knockout, and followed this up with another win, this time via unanimous decision, his first career decision win. Kyle then returned to Strikeforce to fight Rafael Cavalcante in a Light Heavyweight bout at Strikeforce: Lawler vs. Shields. Kyle picked up one of the biggest victories of his career, winning by knockout against the future Strikeforce Light Heavyweight Champion. This was also significant because it was Calvacante's first decisive loss, as his only other defeat was by disqualification against Marcio Cruz.

After his huge win over Calvacante, Kyle fought against Fabrício Werdum in a Heavyweight bout at Strikeforce: Carano vs. Cyborg in San Jose, California. He lost the bout via guillotine choke submission.

He then fought Jeremy Freitag at Xtreme MMA Australia 1 winning via TKO due to knees in the third round.

King of the Cage
Kyle next signed with King of the Cage and fought against Travis Wiuff in a Heavyweight bout, initially winning by TKO (doctor stoppage) in the second round. However, it was changed to a no contest decision after it was determined Kyle hit Wiuff after the bell.

In his second fight with King of the Cage Kyle fought Jon Murphy and won via TKO at 4:53 of round two. He then fought Tony Lopez for the King of the Cage Light Heavyweight Championship and won via split decision after a five-round battle, becoming the King of the Cage Light Heavyweight Champion.

Return to Strikeforce
Kyle fought against Abongo Humphrey at Strikeforce Challengers: del Rosario vs. Mahe. Kyle won via submission in the second round.

Kyle fought against Steve Oliver at Xtreme MMA Australia 3 Kyle won via TKO due to punches in round one, winning the XMMA Light Heavyweight Championship.

Kyle stepped in on late notice to fight Antônio "Bigfoot" Silva at Strikeforce: Henderson vs. Babalu II on December 4 in St. Louis, Missouri in a Heavyweight bout. Kyle knocked Silva down with a powerful right hand and delivered many shots on the ground but was unable to finish. Silva defeated Kyle via second-round TKO. Kyle later revealed that he broke his hand during the fight.

Kyle was set to face Gegard Mousasi at Strikeforce: Diaz vs. Daley, but had to withdraw due to a broken hand. Former UFC veteran Keith Jardine stepped in on short notice as his replacement.

Kyle was again scheduled to fight Mousasi at Strikeforce World Grand Prix: Barnett vs. Kharitonov but Mousasi withdrew for unknown reasons and was replaced by Strikeforce newcomer Marcos Rogério de Lima. Kyle won by unanimous decision, picking apart the younger fighter with boxing techniques.

Kyle was expected to face Gegard Mousasi at Strikeforce: Tate vs. Rousey, but withdrew from the fight due to injury. He next faced Rafael Cavalcante in a rematch at Strikeforce 40 in what would be a title eliminator match for the vacant Strikeforce Light Heavyweight Championship. Kyle lost the fight via guillotine choke in the first round. After the fight, Cavalcante tested positive for a banned substance and, as a result, the CSAC declared the fight a "no contest".

Kyle finally faced Mousasi at Strikeforce: Marquardt vs. Saffiedine on January 12, 2013. He lost via submission in the first round. Kyle said that he would retire following the loss.

Independent Promotions
He has since stated that he will not retire and he was scheduled to fight veteran Valentijn Overeem in May but Overeem was forced out due to injury.

Kyle then had a rematch with Travis Wiuff and won via knockout only 21 seconds into the fight. Kyle landed a lead counter-left hook that rocked the back of Wiuff's head who seemed to be unconscious, Kyle then landed a hammerfist before telling the referee that Wiuff was "out" but the fight had not been called until Kyle landed another punch to the downed Wiuff. Kyle was visibly upset after the fight with the referee, feeling that the stoppage was late.

Kyle was expected to face Maxim Grishin at Fight Nights: Battle of Moscow 17 on September 30, 2014. However, Kyle pulled out of the bout due to injury, he was replaced with Trevor Prangley.

Kyle faced Evgeny Erokhin on December 20, 2014, at FEFoMP: Russia's MMA Supercup. He lost the fight via KO in the second round.

World Series of Fighting
Kyle was to face former UFC veteran Anthony Johnson on September 14, 2013, at WSOF 5. However, Johnson was forced out of the bout due to injury and Kyle faced former UFC Heavyweight Champion Andrei Arlovski at the event. Although he knocked Arlovski down with right hands in the first and third round, he lost the fight via unanimous decision.

Mike Kyle vs. Anthony Johnson was scheduled for December 7, 2013, in Vancouver, British Columbia, Canada but was later canceled because Kyle was forced off the fight because of a broken toe.

Kyle eventually faced Anthony Johnson at WSOF 8. Kyle lost via KO in the first round.

Absolute Championship Berkut
Kyle faced Denis Goltsov on March 26, 2016, at ACB 32. He lost the fight via submission in the first round.

Kyle faced Dan Charles on January 13, 2017, at ACB 51. He won the fight via TKO in the first round.

A rematch with Evgeny Erokhin was expected to take place on July 23, 2017, at ACB 65. However, the bout did not go ahead as planned.

Professional boxing
Kyle made his professional boxing debut on January 17, 2003, as a heavyweight, losing via unanimous decision.

Kyle returned to the boxing ring in 2016, winning via knockout for his first professional win. Kyle would go 0-2-1 before ending the year, however, most recently losing a unanimous decision to undefeated fighter Darmani Rock.

Personal life
Kyle is married and has one daughter with his current wife, as well as two sons from a previous marriage. He is of partial Irish descent.

Championships and accomplishments
King of the Cage
KOTC Light Heavyweight Championship (One time; former)
Xtreme MMA Australia
XMMA Light Heavyweight Championship (One time; former)

Mixed martial arts record

|-
|Loss
|align=center|23–19–1 (2)
|Jordan Powell
|Submission (armbar) 
|PureCombat: Warrior Spirit 2
|
|align=center|1
|align=center|1:03
|Oroville, California, United States
|
|-
|Loss
|align=center|23–18–1 (2)
|Viktor Pešta
|Submission (rear-naked choke) 
|OKTAGON 13
|
|align=center|1
|align=center|1:59
|Prague, Czech Republic
|
|-
|Loss
|align=center|23–17–1 (2)
|Mo De'Reese
|TKO (submission to punches)
|PFL 8
|
|align=center|1
|align=center|2:38
|New Orleans, Louisiana, United States
| 
|-
|Loss
|align=center|23–16–1 (2)
|Caio Alencar
|Decision (unanimous)
|PFL 7
|
|align=center|3
|align=center|5:00
|Atlantic City, New Jersey, United States
| 
|-
|Win
|align=center|23–15–1 (2)
|Daniel Gallemore
|TKO (knees)
|PFL: Fight Night
|
|align=center|1
|align=center|1:01
|Washington, D.C., United States
| 
|-
| Loss
| align=center| 22–15–1 (2)
| Josh Copeland
| Decision (unanimous)
| PFL: Everett
| 
| align=center| 3
| align=center| 5:00
| Everett, Washington, United States
|
|-
| Win
| align=center| 22–14–1 (2)
| Dan Charles
| TKO (punches)
| |ACB 51: Silva vs. Torgeson
| 
| align=center| 1
| align=center| 2:15
| Irvine, California, United States
|
|-
| Loss
| align=center| 21–14–1 (2)
| Denis Goltsov
| Technical Submission (triangle choke)
| |ACB 32: The Battle of Lions
| 
| align=center| 1
| align=center| 2:18
| Moscow, Russia
|
|-
| Loss
| align=center| 21–13–1 (2)
| Clifford Starks
| Decision (unanimous)
| WSOF 22
| 
| align=center| 3
| align=center| 5:00
| Las Vegas, Nevada, United States
|
|-
| Win
| align=center| 21–12–1 (2)
| Baga Agaev
| Submission (guillotine choke)
| Abu Dhabi Warriors 2
| 
| align=center| 1
| align=center| 1:55
| Abu Dhabi, United Arab Emirates
|
|-
| Loss
| align=center| 20–12–1 (2)
| Evgeny Erokhin
| KO (punches)
| FEFoMP: Russia's MMA Supercup
| 
| align=center| 2
| align=center| 2:59
| Khabarovsk, Russia
|
|-
| Loss
| align=center| 20–11–1 (2)
| Anthony Johnson
| KO (punch)
| WSOF 8
| 
| align=center| 1
| align=center| 2:03
| Hollywood, Florida, United States
|
|-
| Loss
| align=center| 20–10–1 (2)
| Andrei Arlovski
| Decision (unanimous)
| WSOF 5
| 
| align=center| 3
| align=center| 5:00
| Atlantic City, New Jersey, United States
| 
|-
| Win
| align=center| 20–9–1 (2)
| Travis Wiuff
| KO (punch)
| CFA 11: Kyle vs. Wiuff 2
| 
| align=center| 1
| align=center| 0:21
| Coral Gables, Florida, United States
| 
|-
| Loss
| align=center| 19–9–1 (2)
| Gegard Mousasi
| Submission (rear-naked choke)
| Strikeforce: Marquardt vs. Saffiedine
| 
| align=center| 1
| align=center| 4:09
| Oklahoma City, Oklahoma, United States
| 
|-
| NC
| align=center| 19–8–1 (2)
| Rafael Cavalcante
| NC (banned substance)
| Strikeforce: Barnett vs. Cormier
| 
| align=center| 1
| align=center| 0:33
| San Jose, California, United States
| 
|-
| Win
| align=center| 19–8–1 (1)
| Marcos Rogério de Lima
| Decision (unanimous)
| Strikeforce: Barnett vs. Kharitonov
| 
| align=center| 3
| align=center| 5:00
| Cincinnati, Ohio, United States
| 
|-
| Loss
| align=center| 18–8–1 (1)
| Antônio Silva
| KO (punches)
| Strikeforce: Henderson vs. Babalu II
| 
| align=center| 2
| align=center| 2:49
| St. Louis, Missouri, United States
| 
|-
| Win
| align=center| 18–7–1 (1)
| Steve Oliver
| TKO (punches)
| Xtreme MMA Australia 3
| 
| align=center| 1
| align=center| N/A
| Sydney, Australia
| 
|-
| Win
| align=center| 17–7–1 (1)
| Abongo Humphrey
| Submission (rear-naked choke)
| Strikeforce Challengers: del Rosario vs. Mahe
| 
| align=center| 2
| align=center| 3:28
| Everett, Washington, United States
| 
|-
| Win
| align=center| 16–7–1 (1)
| Tony Lopez
| Decision (split)
| KOTC: Honor
| 
| align=center| 5
| align=center| 5:00
| Mescalero, New Mexico, United States
| 
|-
| Win
| align=center| 15–7–1 (1)
| Jon Murphy
| KO (punches and elbows)
| KOTC: Legacy
| 
| align=center| 2
| align=center| 4:53
| Reno, Nevada, United States
|
|-
| NC
| align=center| 14–7–1 (1)
| Travis Wiuff
| NC (overturned)
| KOTC: Vengeance
| 
| align=center| 2
| align=center| 5:00
| Mescalero, New Mexico, United States
| 
|-
| Win
| align=center| 14–7–1
| Jeremy Freitag
| TKO (punches)
| Xtreme MMA Australia 1
| 
| align=center| 3
| align=center| 4:51
| Sydney, Australia
| 
|-
| Loss
| align=center| 13–7–1
| Fabrício Werdum
| Submission (guillotine choke)
| Strikeforce: Carano vs. Cyborg
| 
| align=center| 1
| align=center| 1:24
| San Jose, California, United States
| 
|-
| Win
| align=center| 13–6–1
| Rafael Cavalcante
| KO (punches)
| Strikeforce: Lawler vs. Shields
| 
| align=center| 2
| align=center| 4:05
| St. Louis, Missouri, United States
| 
|-
| Win
| align=center| 12–6–1
| Mychal Clark
| Decision (unanimous)
| JG/TKT Promotions: Fighting 4 Kidz
| 
| align=center| 3
| align=center| 5:00
| Santa Monica, California, United States
| 
|-
| Win
| align=center| 11–6–1
| Rudy Martin
| KO (punches)
| |IFC: Caged Combat
| 
| align=center| 1
| align=center| 0:41
| Nampa, Idaho, United States
|Light Heavyweight debut.
|-
| Loss
| align=center| 10–6–1
| Wayne Cole
| Submission (armbar)
| Strikeforce: Shamrock vs. Le
| 
| align=center| 1
| align=center| 0:45
| San Jose, California, United States
| 
|-
| Loss
| align=center| 10–5–1
| Brian Olsen
| DQ (soccer kicks and strikes after the bell)
| WEC 20
| 
| align=center| 1
| align=center| 3:45
| Lemoore, California, United States
| 
|-
| Draw
| align=center| 10–4–1
| Krzysztof Soszynski
| Technical Draw
| Strikeforce: Shamrock vs. Gracie
| 
| align=center| 1
| align=center| 2:02
| San Jose, California, United States
| 
|-
| Loss
| align=center| 10–4
| Devin Cole
| TKO (punches)
| WEC 18: Unfinished Business
| 
| align=center| 2
| align=center| 2:56
| Lemoore, California, United States
| 
|-
| Win
| align=center| 10–3
| Tsuyoshi Kohsaka
| Technical Decision (unanimous)
| Pancrase: Spiral 8
| 
| align=center| 3
| align=center| 1:17
| Yokohama, Japan
| 
|-
| Win
| align=center| 9–3
| James Irvin
| KO (punch)
| UFC 51
| 
| align=center| 1
| align=center| 1:55
| Las Vegas, Nevada, United States
| 
|-
| Loss
| align=center| 8–3
| Justin Eilers
| KO (punch)
| UFC 49
| 
| align=center| 1
| align=center| 1:14
| Las Vegas, Nevada, United States
| 
|-
| Win
| align=center| 8–2
| Wes Sims
| KO (punch)
| UFC 47
| 
| align=center| 1
| align=center| 4:59
| Las Vegas, Nevada, United States
| 
|-
| Win
| align=center| 7–2
| Jude Hargett
| KO (punches)
| WEC 9
| 
| align=center| 1
| align=center| 4:09
| Lemoore, California, United States
|Won the vacant WEC Heavyweight Championship.
|-
| Win
| align=center| 6–2
| Dan Chase
| KO (injury)
| King of the Rockies
| 
| align=center| 1
| align=center| 0:12
| Fort Collins, Colorado, United States
| 
|-
| Win
| align=center| 5–2
| Jason Reed
| TKO (submission to punches)
| IFC: Battleground Boise
| 
| align=center| 1
| align=center| 1:52
| Boise, Idaho, United States
| 
|-
| Win
| align=center| 4–2
| Jerry Vrbanovic
| KO (punches)
| WEC 8
| 
| align=center| 1
| align=center| 0:12
| Lemoore, California, United States
| 
|-
| Loss
| align=center| 3–2
| Paul Buentello
| KO (punches)
| KOTC 18
| 
| align=center| 2
| align=center| 1:24
| Reno, Nevada, United States
|Heavyweight debut.
|-
| Loss
| align=center| 3–1
| Dan Bobish
| TKO (submission to punches)
| KOTC 13
| 
| align=center| 1
| align=center| 3:25
| Reno, Nevada, United States
| 
|-
| Win
| align=center| 3–0
| Nate Russak
| TKO (submission to punches)
| Gladiator Challenge 9
| 
| align=center| 1
| align=center| 2:39
| San Jacinto, California, United States
| 
|-
| Win
| align=center| 2–0
| Kauai Kupihea
| KO (punches)
| Night of the Knockout 2
| 
| align=center| 2
| align=center| N/A
| Boise, Idaho, United States
| 
|-
| Win
| align=center| 1–0
| Andrew Boyle
| TKO (punches)
| Night of the Knockout 1
| 
| align=center| 1
| align=center| 1:30
| Boise, Idaho, United States
|

Professional boxing record

Bare knuckle record

|-
|Loss
|align=center|0–2
|Gustavo Trujillo	
|KO (punches)
|BKFC 22: Lombard vs. Hunt
| 
|align=center|1
|align=center|0:34
|Miami, Florida, United States
|
|-
|Loss
|align=center|0–1
|Bobo O'Bannon
|TKO (retirement)
|Toe the Line 2
|
|align=center|2
|align=center|2:00
|Plant City, Florida, United States
|
|-

See also
 List of male mixed martial artists
 List of current WSOF fighters

References

External links
 
 

American male mixed martial artists
Mixed martial artists from Idaho
Light heavyweight mixed martial artists
Heavyweight mixed martial artists
Mixed martial artists utilizing boxing
Mixed martial artists utilizing Brazilian jiu-jitsu
1980 births
Living people
African-American mixed martial artists
Ultimate Fighting Championship male fighters
American practitioners of Brazilian jiu-jitsu
African-American boxers
Heavyweight boxers
21st-century African-American sportspeople
20th-century African-American people